Sir Everard Alexander Hambro  (11 April 1842 – 26 February 1925) was a British banker and philanthropist.

Early life 
Everard Hambro was born 11 April 1842 in Willesden, London. His father, Carl Joachim Hambro, was a Danish immigrant who founded the Hambros Bank in London in 1839. His paternal grandfather, Joseph Hambro, was a Danish banker and political advisor. His paternal great-grandfather, Calmer Hambro, was a Danish merchant and banker.

He graduated from Trinity College, Cambridge.

Career
Hambro started his career at the family business, Hambros Bank, in 1869.

He served on the board of directors of the Bank of England from 1879 to 1925. He helped save Barings Bank in 1891. As a member of the Fowler Committee, Everard Hambro submitted a separate note proposing the setting up of a state bank in India along the lines of the Bank of England and Bank of France.

Personal life

He was married twice. He married Gertrude Mary Stuart in 1866. They resided at Milton Abbey in Milton, Dorset. They had five children:
Sir Charles Eric Hambro.
Lt.-Col. Harold Everard Hambro.
Angus Valdemar Hambro.
Violet Mary Hambro.
Ronald Olaf Hambro.

Violet married Everard Martin Smith and her elder son was Eric Martin Smith, MP. Everard Hambro married Ebba Harline d'Iberville Le Moyne Whyte in 1911.

Death
He died on 26 February 1925.

References

1842 births
1925 deaths
People from Willesden
People from Dorset
Alumni of Trinity College, Cambridge
Bankers from London
English Jews
People associated with the Bank of England
British people of Danish descent
Barons of Denmark
Everard
Knights Commander of the Royal Victorian Order